The Second Jonckheer cabinet was the 2nd cabinet of the Netherlands Antilles.

Composition
The cabinet was composed as follows:

|Minister of General Affairs
|Efrain Jonckheer
|DP
|3 October 1958
|-
|Minister of Social Affairs, Economic Affairs
|Ciro Domenico Kroon
|DP
|3 October 1958
|-
|rowspan="2"|Minister of Justice
|S.W. van der Meer
|DP
|3 October 1958
|-
|Ramez Jorge Isa
|DP
|17 August 1959
|-
|rowspan="3"|Minister of Traffic and Communications
|Frederick C.J. Beaujon 
|PPA
|3 October 1958
|-
|Efrain Jonckheer
|DP
|
|-
|Ernesto O. Petronia
|PPA
|1 June 1961
|-
|rowspan="2"|Minister of Public Health
|Frederick C.J. Beaujon 
|PPA
|3 October 1958
|-
|Isaac C. Debrot
|KVP
|13 July 1959
|-
|rowspan="2"|Minister of Welfare
|Juan E. Irausquin 
|PPA
|3 October 1958
|-
|Oscar S. Henriquez
|PPA
|10 July 1962
|-
|rowspan="2"|Minister of Finance
|Juan E. Irausquin 
|PPA
|3 October 1958
|-
|Oscar S. Henriquez
|PPA
|10 July 1962
|-
|rowspan="3"|Minister of Education and Popular Education
|Ciro Domenico Kroon
|DP
|3 October 1958
|-
|Felipito B. Tromp
|UNA
|19 December 1958
|-
|Francisco D. Figaroa
|UNA
|1 June 1961
|}

 Beaujon was appointed Lieutenant governor of Aruba.
 Irausquin died unexpectedly on 20 June 1962.

References

Cabinets of the Netherlands Antilles
1958 establishments in the Netherlands Antilles
Cabinets established in 1958
Cabinets disestablished in 1962
1962 disestablishments in the Netherlands Antilles